The article contains bi-directional text.

K-P-R is a Semitic root, in Arabic and Hebrew rendered as K-F-R.
The basic meaning of the root is "to cover", but it is used in the sense "to conceal" and hence "to deny", and its notability derives from its use for religious heresy or apostasy (as it were describing the "concealment" of religious truth) in both Islam and Judaism.

Etymology
Georges Bohas and Mihai Dat, in a study of triconsonantal Semitic roots, noted a connection of X-p-r, p-r-X and p-X-r roots (where X is another consonant) with meanings like "break off", "part," "cut", "shut off", "remove", "break up", "hide", "expel", suggesting a Proto-Semitic biconsontal root pr meaning "cut, divide." It is first attested in the Akkadian verb kaparu ("wipe, smear"), with D-stem kupparu.

Amharic
 Qofere dug

Arabic

Concepts
Kufr, Kefirah — negation of the faith; disbelief
Kofrim — "coverer" — unbeliever; "a person who hides or covers the truth"
Takfīr — excommunication
Mukaffir — the act which precipitates takfīr
Kafare (Arabic) — sentence for a crime, for example lashes for adultery, used in religious issues
kafr  ) — village
Kaffarah; Kofer — compensation for damages in Quranic, Talmudic and Mishnaic tort law.

Sunni Hadith
 will appear on the front of the face of dajjāl.

Hebrew
 Kofer-nefesh."The price of a life", "a ransom", compared to Teutonic Weregild.
 The spelling "כופר" (with the stress on the e, which stands for צירה which is a long vowel) can mean an unbeliever, similar to the Arabic kafir, see Apostasy in Judaism, Heresy in Orthodox Judaism
 The main meaning of the root כפר is "atone". For example, in יום כפור (Yom Kippur), the Day of Atonement.
 Kfar — village
Kaparah — atonement for a transgression, or compensation through monetary or spiritual means. See Kaparot
Yom Kippur — the day of atonement

References

Triconsonantal roots